Pseudotelphusa floridana is a moth of the family Gelechiidae. It is found in North America, where it has been recorded from Florida.

References

Moths described in 2011
Pseudotelphusa